Nürnberg-Steinbühl station is a railway station in Nuremberg, Bavaria, Germany. The station is on the Nuremberg–Bamberg
and Nuremberg–Roth lines of Deutsche Bahn. It is served by Nuremberg S-Bahn lines S1 and S2. It is also served by Nuremberg tram routes 4 and 6.

History
The station was opened on 5 September 2004.

Location
The station is located in the west of Nuremberg.

References

External links
 

Steinbuhl
Steinbuhl
Railway stations in Germany opened in 2004